Myriam Cyr is a Canadian actress and writer. As an actress she is best known for her roles as Claire Clairmont in the 1986 horror film Gothic and Ultra Violet in the 1996 biopic I Shot Andy Warhol. In 2006 she published the non-fiction work Letters of a Portuguese Nun: Uncovering the Mystery Behind a 17th Century Forbidden Love.
In 2017 she co-wrote and directed the play ‘Saltonstall’s Trial’ set during the Salem witch trial.

Selected filmography

Personal life
Myriam Cyr is mother to three boys, James, Gabriel, and Leonid. She has two sisters, including actress and singer Isabelle Cyr, and one brother. She has been married to her husband, Gifford West, for over twenty years.

References

External links

Official website

https://punctuate4.org/our-story

https://www.bostonglobe.com/opinion/2019/10/02/judge-who-hunted-for-truth-not-witches/fKKTbUa7DULdWgbxBzl88K/story.html%3foutputType=amp

1960 births
Living people
Canadian film actresses
Canadian stage actresses
Canadian women non-fiction writers
Actresses from New Brunswick
Writers from New Brunswick
21st-century Canadian non-fiction writers
21st-century Canadian women writers

https://www.salemnews.com/news/lifestyles/history-in-the-making-play-based-on-salem-witch-trials-opens-in-beverly/article_dc4130cc-2069-5ef6-942b-402ffee76869.html